"Let's Ride" is the lead single released from Montell Jordan's third album of the same name. The song was produced by Teddy Bishop, arranged by R&B singer Case and featured verses from American rappers Master P and Silkk the Shocker.

"Let's Ride" became a huge hit in 1998, making it to #2 on the Billboard Hot 100, held from the #1 spot by K-Ci & JoJo's "All My Life". The song also spent three non-consecutive weeks at #1 on the Hot R&B/Hip-Hop Singles & Tracks, becoming his second most successful single after 1995's "This Is How We Do It". "Let's Ride" was certified platinum by the RIAA on April 22, 1998 for individual sales of over 1,000,000 copies. The song was sent to radio stations on February 17, 1998.

Single track listing

A-Side
"Let's Ride" (Radio Edit)- 3:47

B-Side
"Let's Ride" (LP Version)- 4:51
"Let's Ride" (Instrumental)- 4:51

Charts and certifications

Weekly charts

Year-end charts

Certifications

|}

See also
List of number-one R&B singles of 1998 (U.S.)

References

1998 singles
Music videos directed by Joseph Kahn
Montell Jordan songs
Master P songs
Silkk the Shocker songs
Songs written by Montell Jordan